North West Sydney Spirit Football Club is an Australian semi-professional association football club based in Newcastle. The club was formed in 1998 as Northern Spirit and joined the National Soccer League in the 1998–99 and became defunct in 2004. They were re-formed later in 2004 as GHFA Spirit who was selected along with 11 other teams to join the new second division of soccer in New South Wales. The club's first team spent eight seasons in the National Soccer League. The table details the club's achievements in major competitions, and the top scorers for each season.

History
North West Sydney Spirit's first season started in the National Soccer League in 1998–99 as Northern Spirit, finishing 5th of 15 and reaching the elimination-finals. The next three seasons were failures to qualify for the Finals series, until the change of the Finals series to the Championship play-offs in the NSL which the club qualified for in the 2002–03 season finishing 5th out of 6. The final season of the NSL in 2003–04 for Northern Spirit had them finish 7th slightly missing on the return of the Finals series for the last time. The club moved to state league football from the 2005 season onwards moving into the NSW Division One, the third tier of football in New South Wales at the time. They won their first trophy in 2007 winning the Division One championship while also being promoted to the Super League in 2008. The 2009 season had saw them win three consecutive championships. It would be another five seasons before finishing 1st until the 2015 season. They qualified for the Australia Cup Final Rounds for the first time in the 2022 season.

Key
Key to league competitions:

 National Soccer League (NSL) – Australia's former top football league, established in 1977 and dissolved in 2004.
 NSW League One (League One) – The second tier of football in New South Wales

Key to colours and symbols:

Key to league record:
 Season = The year and article of the season
 Pos = Final position
 Pld = Matches played
 W = Matches won
 D = Matches drawn
 L = Matches lost
 GF = Goals scored
 GA = Goals against
 Pts = Points

Seasons

References
General
 

Specific

North West Sydney Spirit